Jonathan Saul Freedland (born 25 February 1967) is a British journalist who writes a weekly column for The Guardian. He presents BBC Radio 4's contemporary history series The Long View. Freedland also writes thrillers, mainly under the pseudonym Sam Bourne, and has written a play, Jews. In Their Own Words, performed in 2022 at the Royal Court Theatre, London.

Early life 
The youngest of three children and the only son of a Jewish couple, biographer and journalist Michael Freedland, and Israeli-born Sara Hocherman, he was educated at University College School, a boys' independent school in Hampstead, London. As a child, Freedland periodically accompanied his father for broadcasting work. On one occasion, his father was interviewing Eric Morecambe, who comically assumed the 10 year-old Freedland was married. After a gap year working on a kibbutz in Israel with the Labour Zionist Habonim Dror (where Freedland had been a mentor to Sacha Baron Cohen), he studied Philosophy, Politics and Economics (PPE) at Wadham College, Oxford. While at Oxford, he was editor of Cherwell, the student newspaper.

Journalism 
Freedland began his Fleet Street career at the short-lived Sunday Correspondent. In 1990 he joined the BBC as a news reporter across radio and television, including for The World at One and Today on Radio 4. In 1992, he was awarded the Laurence Stern fellowship on The Washington Post, serving as a staff writer on national news. He was Washington Correspondent for The Guardian from 1993 until 1997, when he returned to London as an editorial writer and columnist.

Between 2002 and 2004, Freedland was an occasional columnist for the Daily Mirror and from 2005 to 2007 he wrote a weekly column for the London Evening Standard. He writes a monthly column for The Jewish Chronicle. He has also been published in The New York Times, The New York Review of Books, Newsweek and The New Republic.

Freedland was named 'Columnist of the Year' in the 2002 What the Papers Say awards and in 2008 was awarded the David Watt Prize for Journalism, in recognition of his essay "Bush's Amazing Achievement", published in The New York Review of Books. Nominated on seven occasions, Freedland was awarded a special Orwell Prize in May 2014 for his journalism. In 2016, he won the "Commentariat of the Year" prize at the Comment Awards.

Freedland was executive editor of the opinion section of The Guardian from May 2014 till early 2016 and continues to write a Saturday column for it.

In November 2019, Freedland apologised for making a "very bad error" in falsely reporting that a shortlisted Labour prospective parliamentary candidate had been fined for making antisemitic remarks on Facebook. He attributed the mistaken identification by confusing two lawyers with the same name to a "previously reliable Labour source" whose information he had "passed on too hastily".

Author 
Freedland has published twelve books: three non-fiction works under his own name and nine novels, eight of them under the pseudonym Sam Bourne.

Bring Home the Revolution: The case for a British Republic (1998), Freedland's first book, argued that Britain should reclaim the revolutionary ideals it exported to America in the 18th century, and undergo a constitutional and cultural overhaul. The book won a W. Somerset Maugham Award for non-fiction and was later adapted into a two-part series for BBC Television.

Jacob's Gift (2005) is a memoir recounting the lives of three generations of his own Jewish family as well as exploring wider questions of identity and belonging. In 2008, he broadcast a two-part series for BBC Radio 4 – British Jews and the Dream of Zion – as well as two TV documentaries for BBC Four: How to be a Good President and President Hollywood.

The Righteous Men (2006), is a religious thriller published under the Bourne pen name. It is about a news reporter whose life is disrupted when his wife is kidnapped while he is reporting a story of a militia man found dead. As more murders of 'righteous men' happen across the globe, Will soon finds himself in the middle of a plot to bring about nothing less than Judgement Day.

The book was followed by another Sam Bourne title, The Last Testament (2007), set against the backdrop of the Middle East peace process. It draws on the author's experiences in that region as a reporter for over twenty years, and a Guardian newspaper sponsored dialogue which was influential in the 2003 Geneva Accords. The central character finds herself involved in a mix of the modern political situation and ancient revelations. The Final Reckoning (2008), was based on the true story of the Avengers: a group of Holocaust survivors who sought revenge against their Nazi persecutors, and just missed the peak of The Sunday Times best-seller list. Just before The Chosen One (2010), the fourth thriller by Sam Bourne was published in the UK, The Bookseller reported in April 2010 that HarperCollins had signed Freedland for three more Bourne books. HarperCollins published "Pantheon" in July 2012. Freedland's sixth novel entitled "American Winter" was published in 2014 under the Sam Bourne name, but was withdrawn and reissued as The 3rd Woman, published by HarperCollins in 2015 under his own name. His sixth Bourne novel, To Kill a President, was published by HarperCollins on 4 July 2017. The seventh novel under the Sam Bourne pseudonym, To Kill the Truth, was published in February 2019.

He is the author of The Escape Artist: The Man Who Broke Out of Auschwitz to Warn the World, a biography of Rudolf Vrba, who participated in the first escape by Jews from the Auschwitz concentration camp.   It was shortlisted for the 2022 Waterstones Book of the Year.

Freedland is also the writer of a stage play Jews. In Their Own Words. performed at the Royal Court Theatre and directed by Vicky Featherstone in 2002.

Views

Israel, Zionism and antisemitism 
A leading liberal Zionist in the UK, he wrote in 2012 that he uses the word Zionism infrequently, as the word has been misunderstood and has become defined as right-wing. On the 2014 Israel–Gaza conflict, he believes that military action perpetuates conflict and has called for negotiations to end the cycles of violence. He defends Israel's right to exist, but hopes that Israel will recognise the 'high price' paid by Palestinians.

While Jeremy Corbyn was leader Freedland accused the Labour Party in the UK of being in denial on the issue of antisemitism, but Freedland approves of Keir Starmer's approach to the issue.  He has urged the left to treat Jews "the same way you'd treat any other minority". He has also commented on the perceived antisemitic expressions of Palestinians with whom Corbyn has associated and expressed the view that many of the Labour Party's new members were hostile to Jews.  

Jewish heritage

Freedland is a supporter of projects that seek to preserve Jewish identity and heritage. He has frequently written about the importance of both his faith and his cultural heritage. He has also been active in campaigns to save British Jewish heritage.

Personal life 
Freedland is married to Sarah Peters, a radio and podcast producer. They have two sons, Jacob and Sam, and conform to Masorti Judaism. He is a governor of Simon Marks Jewish Primary School in Stamford Hill.

Bibliography

Books

Non-fiction 
 Bring Home the Revolution: The Case for a British Republic (Fourth Estate, 1998) 
 Jacob's Gift: A Journey into the Heart of Belonging (Hamish Hamilton, 2005), 
 The Escape Artist: The Man Who Broke Out of Auschwitz to Warn the World (John Murray, 2022)

Fiction 
 The Righteous Men (HarperCollins, 2006) 
 The Last Testament, published elsewhere as The Jerusalem Secret (HarperCollins, 2007) 
 The Final Reckoning (HarperCollins, 2008) 
 The Chosen One (HarperCollins, 2010) 
 Pantheon (HarperCollins, 5 July 2012) 
 The 3rd Woman (Harper 4 August 2015)  (first published as by J. Freedland, not Sam Bourne)
 To Kill the President (HarperCollins, 12 June 2017)  
 To Kill the Truth (Quercus, 21 February 2019) 
 To Kill a Man (Quercus, 19 March 2020)

Articles 
 "Trump's Chaver in Jerusalem" (review of Anshel Pfeffer, Bibi:  The Turbulent Life and Times of Benjamin Netanyahu, Basic Books, 2018), New York Review of Books, vol. LXV, no 13 (16 August 2018), pp. 32–34.  "As Pfeffer concludes, 'His [Netanyahu's] ultimate legacy will not be a more secure nation, but a deeply fractured Israeli society, living behind walls.'"

References

External links 

Dibdin's review of The Righteous Men
Guardian readers' editor Ian Mayes's column
Jonathan Freedland extended interview with Al Gore
Journalisted – Articles by Jonathan Freedland
Freedland archive from The New York Review of Books

1967 births
Living people
British Jews
British male journalists
British republicans
People educated at University College School
The Guardian journalists
21st-century English novelists
English thriller writers
Writers from London
English male novelists
21st-century English male writers
British Jewish writers
Jewish journalists
Jewish novelists
British Zionists
Jewish dramatists and playwrights
21st-century pseudonymous writers
British Conservative Jews